Maija Kaufmane (née Pampura on 7 May 1941) is a retired Latvian rower. Together with Daina Šveica she won three consecutive European titles in the double sculls in 1963–1965.

References

1941 births
Living people
Latvian female rowers
Soviet female rowers
European Rowing Championships medalists